Wodrow may refer to a number of things or people:

Wilson-Wodrow-Mytinger House, built by Andrew Wodrow, an American Revolutionary patriot
Robert Wodrow (1679–1734), Scottish historian
Andrew Wodrow (1752–1814), Scottish American merchant, militia officer, clerk of court, lawyer and landowner